The Dharmavaram–Pakala branch line connects Dharmavaram of Anantapur district with Pakala of Chittoor district in the Indian state of Andhra Pradesh. It is under the jurisdiction of Guntakal railway division.

History 
This branch line was built as a meter-gauge line during British Raj in India and opened for traffic in 1891. After independence, recently South Central Railway zone converted this line into a broad-gauge line, which opened for traffic on June 30, 2010. The railway line was sanctioned in the year 1997–98.

The Main Station in this line is:

 Dharmavaram Junction

 Kadiri Railway Station

 Madanapalle Road

 Pakala Junction

References 

5 ft 6 in gauge railways in India
Guntakal railway division